Bouchetispira  is a genus of sea snails. The genus Bouchetispira is the only genus in the family Bouchetispiridae. The scientific name of the genus and family are in honour of Philippe Bouchet, a French taxonomist and malacologist.

Species
 Bouchetispira ponderi Hallan, Criscione, Fedosov & Puillandre, 2019
 Bouchetispira vitrea Kantor, E. E. Strong & Puillandre, 2012

References

Further reading
 Kantor, Y. I.; Strong, E. E.; Puillandre, N. (2012). A new lineage of Conoidea (Gastropoda: Neogastropoda) revealed by morphological and molecular data. Journal of Molluscan Studies. 78(3): 246-255
 Hallan A., Criscione F., Fedosov A.E. & Puillandre N. (2019). Bouchetispira ponderi n. sp. (Conoidea: Bouchetispiridae), a new deep-sea gastropod from temperate Australia. Molluscan Research. DOI: 10.1080/13235818.2019.1681626.

Conoidea
Gastropod genera